Walter Olkewicz (May 14, 1948 – April 6, 2021) was an American character actor. He played Marko in the short-lived TV series Wizards and Warriors and Coach Wordman in the feature film Making the Grade.

Biography
Olkewicz was born in Bayonne, New Jersey, and attended a Catholic grammar school there and St. Peter's Preparatory School in Jersey City before graduating from Bayonne High School in 1965. He continued his education at Plains College in Kansas and at Colorado State University. During his high-school years, he was active in plays. Before he began acting professionally, Olkewicz sold insurance, sold office supplies, and drove a taxi.

Early in his career, Olkewicz acted with improv and other groups. He co-founded the improvisational group Saturday Bath, which had a national tour that lasted more than a year.Originally billed as Ray Holland, He appeared in the films Futureworld (1976), The Greatest (1977), Summer Camp (1979), Hot T-Shirts (1981), and The Client (1994).

Olkewicz guest-starred in many TV shows, including Barney Miller (two episodes), Night Court, Seinfeld, ER, and Who's the Boss?. He was a semi-regular performer on Dolly Parton's 1987–88 variety show Dolly! and appeared in several episodes of Grace Under Fire. He played Jacques and Jean-Michel Renault on Twin Peaks (1990). 

Olkewicz died at his Reseda, California, home after a long illness on April 6, 2021 at age 72. His son, Zac Olkewicz, is a screenwriter. During the time of his illness, he crafted a series of YouTube videos reaching out to all of his friends from his years of work, hoping that someone he knew would help him. The video messages were posted as being meant for Whoopi Goldberg, Sam Elliott, Chuck Lorre, Tommy Lee Jones, and John Larroquette, among many others. He spoke of his illness and struggling to get back into work. The pain that he was in, his substantial number of knee surgeries (19 at that point as he states). As well as his resulting insurance-related financial losses. In his message to John Larroquette, he said he'd been out of work approximately 12 years because he was too sick to go on, with the exception of two episodes of Twin Peaks where he appeared in 2017. His final video was posted as "Message to Sam Elliott."

Filmography

Film

Television

Video games

References

External links
 

1948 births
2021 deaths
American male television actors
American male film actors
Male actors from New Jersey
Actors from Bayonne, New Jersey